The  was a Japanese DC electric multiple unit (EMU) train type operated on limited express services by Japanese National Railways (JNR) from 1959 until 1980.

Operations

157 series EMUs were also introduced on seasonal Hibiki services on the Tokaido Main Line from 21 November 1959, and were later used on Amagi and Soyokaze services.

Fleet details
 KuMoHa 157-1 – 10: Driving motor cars
 MoHa 156-1 – 10: Intermediate motor cars, with one pantograph
 SaHa 157-1 – 5: Intermediate trailer cars
 SaRo 157-1 – 6: Intermediate "Green" (first class) trailer cars
 KuRo 157-1: Imperial train car (see below)

External livery
Initially painted in the JNR livery of beige ("Cream No. 4") and crimson ("Red No. 11"), the red colour was later changed to a slightly darker shade ("Red No. 2") when the sets were modified with the addition of air-conditioning.

KuRo 157-1 imperial train car
The 157 series fleet included a dedicated imperial train car, built by Kawasaki Sharyo (present-day Kawasaki Heavy Industries) and delivered in June 1960. Numbered KuRo 157-1, the car could be inserted into 157 series formations for use on imperial train workings. One end had a gangwayed driving cab based on the 153 series EMU design, although the car was normally sandwiched in the middle of a 157 series formation, and was only very rarely used with the driving cab leading. In 1979, the car was modified for use in conjunction with 183 series EMUs, with the first official working on 2 July 1980. From March 1985, it was repainted in cream with a green stripe for use in conjunction with 185 series EMUs.

The last official operation of the car was on 8 September 1993.

Following retirement, the KuRo 157-1 car remained in storage at Tamachi Depot for many years, but was moved to Tokyo General Rolling Stock Centre in the early hours of 2 December 2012.

History
The first 157 series set was delivered in August 1959, and entered service on Nikkō semi express services between Tokyo and Nikkō from 22 September 1959. Air-conditioning was added to the trains from 1962.

With the exception of the special imperial train car KuRo 157-1, the entire fleet of 157 series trains was withdrawn by 1980.

Fleet details
The individual car histories are as follows.

References

Electric multiple units of Japan
East Japan Railway Company
Train-related introductions in 1959
1959 in rail transport